Scusa se è poco is a 1982 Italian comedy film written and directed  by Marco Vicario and starring Monica Vitti, Ugo Tognazzi and Diego Abatantuono.

Plot
Two episodes, both focused on the middle-aged married couple in crisis: in the first, the couple divorced rent, unbeknownst to each other, the same apartment; in the second, the wife of a respected dentist writes, under a false name, a pornographic highly successful novel.

Cast  
 Monica Vitti as  Renata Adorni / Grazia Siriani  
 Ugo Tognazzi as  Carlo Reani 
 Diego Abatantuono as  Piero
 Orazio Orlando as Tullio 
 Mario Carotenuto  as  Tullio's Father
  Fiorenza Marchegiani  as  Isabella 
 Mauro Di Francesco as  Filippo 
 Nanda Primavera as  Giovanna  
 Enzo Robutti as Lawyer Sacchetti Morini 
 Maurizio Mattioli as The Florist
 Loredana Martinez as  Gertrude

See also       
 List of Italian films of 1982

References

External links

Italian comedy films
1982 comedy films
1982 films
1980s Italian-language films
1980s Italian films